SCAS can stand for:

 Southern Cross Astronomical Society
 Sigur Center for Asian Studies
 Scarborough Centre for Alternative Studies, located in the former Midland Avenue Collegiate Institute
 Spence Children's Anxiety Scale, a psychological assessment tool
 Swiss Center for Affective Sciences
 South Central Ambulance Service
 Swedish Collegium for Advanced Study